Duke Franz Joseph in Bavaria, full German name: Franz Joseph Michael Karl Maria Evaristus Quirinus Ottokar Herzog in Bayern
(23 March 1888, Schloss Tegernsee, Kingdom of Bavaria – 23 September 1912, Munich, Kingdom of Bavaria) was a Duke in Bavaria and member of the House of Wittelsbach. Franz Joseph was the fifth and youngest child of Duke Karl-Theodor in Bavaria and his wife Infanta Maria Josepha of Portugal. Franz Joseph was the brother of Duke Ludwig Wilhelm in Bavaria and sisters Duchess Amalie in Bavaria, Duchess Sophie Adelheid in Bavaria, Duchess Elisabeth in Bavaria and Duchess Marie Gabrielle in Bavaria.

Life 
He was the youngest son of Duke Karl-Theodor in Bavaria and his second wife Infanta Maria Josepha of Portugal, born in 1888 and was the brother of Queen Elisabeth of Belgium and Princess Marie Gabrielle of Bavaria.

The Duke was a first lieutenant in Kaiser Wilhelm's own regiment of Uhlans, and a special instructor in the royal military riding academy in Munich. His horsemanship won him many prizes in German riding competitions.

In America 
He visited the US in 1910 and hunted grizzly bears though the US press speculated on a possible American match (so popular at the time). The speculation was furthered when Franz Joseph commented on his cousin Prince Miguel's lovely American bride, Anita Stewart. He also told the papers nothing would 'stand in the way' of an American match though that wasn't the purpose of the visit. Before heading out west, he was widely feted in East Coast society.

Duke Franz Josef also spent time in New York City, where he stayed at the Plaza, and he was the "most-talked-about nobleman" to visit the US since Prince Henry of Prussia. Franz did not stand on ceremony. He liked to stroll about the city without his "suite of servants." He took in boxing matches, "took a look behind the scenes in the leading Broadway comic operas." He commented as being "highly pleased" with American chorus girls. The local media hailed the duke as "the most democratic nobleman that had ever landed in New York."  Franz Josef was introduced to numerous American debutantes, but left the country without "tales of romance." He explained that he could not marry an American "unless he chose to lose his standing in the ducal family at home."

Franz Joseph died of polio in 1912, the very same year as his sisters Marie Gabrielle and Amélie, which made this year quite an "annus horribilis" for the Wittelsbach family.  He was only 24 years old at the time of his death.

Through his relationship with Caroline "Lilly" Stockhammer (1891-1952), he became the progenitor of the von Plottnitz-Stockhammer family, which has produced descendants prominent in politics, education, and the arts.  He is the grandfather of the German politician Rupert von Plottnitz (Franz-Joseph Rupert Ottomar von Plottnitz-Stockhammer), born July 4, 1940 in Danzig.

References

1888 births
1912 deaths
House of Wittelsbach
Dukes in Bavaria
Members of the Bavarian Reichsrat
Nobility from Munich